Cristián Heyne (born January 13, 1973 in Santiago) is a Chilean composer and producer, and formally a journalist. Initially, he was the leader of alternative rock band Christianes, and later of the experimental unit Shogún. Then he started to focus on making music for other artists, and made several hits in the Chilean pop scene. He is also the owner of two Chileans indie labels: Luna, founded in 1998 and Unión del Sur, founded with Javiera Mena in 2010.

Works

Soundtracks
Los debutantes
Se arrienda
Machuca (in some musical pieces)

TV series
Villa dulce (Canal 13)

Artists he has worked with
Álex Anwandter
Camila Moreno
Chinoy
Danna Paola
Dënver
Gepe
Glup!
Javiera Mena
Javiera y los Imposibles
Luis Jara
Luna in Caelo
Malcorazón
Pánico
Supernova
Stereo 3

References

External links
 
Official blog

1973 births
Living people
Chilean musicians